Alesia is a historic house located at 108 North Morgan Avenue in Broussard, Louisiana.

Built c.1900 by Herbert Billeaud for his wife Alice, the house is a large Queen Anne style frame cottage ornated by a Colonial Revival gallery with double columns.

The house was listed on the National Register of Historic Places on March 14, 1983.

It is one of 10 individually NRHP-listed houses in the "Broussard Multiple Resource Area", which also includes: 

Billeaud House
Martial Billeaud Jr. House  
Valsin Broussard House 
Comeaux House 
Ducrest Building
Janin Store 
Roy-LeBlanc House 
St. Cecilia School 
St. Julien House 
Main Street Historic District

See also
 National Register of Historic Places listings in Lafayette Parish, Louisiana

References

Houses on the National Register of Historic Places in Louisiana
Queen Anne architecture in Louisiana
Houses completed in 1900
Lafayette Parish, Louisiana
National Register of Historic Places in Lafayette Parish, Louisiana